Euhyponomeutoides albithoracellus, the currant bud moth, is a moth of the family Yponomeutidae. It is found in Fennoscandia, Denmark, Germany, Poland, the Baltic region, Romania, Slovakia, Austria, Switzerland and France.

The wingspan is 12–16 mm. The forewings are ochreous with a white costal margin. The hindwings are brownish grey. Adults are on wing from late June to mid-July.

The larvae feed on Ribes species. Young larvae overwinter and become active in early spring. They initially feed within the buds of their host plant. Older larvae feed on young shoots and spin silken threads over the damaged leaves. Pupation takes place in a silken cocoon. The larvae have a light green body and yellowish green head.

References

Moths described in 1954
Yponomeutidae
Moths of Europe